is a Japanese automotive parts company that makes vehicle braking systems and aluminium products. The company was founded in 1953 and is listed on the first section Tokyo Stock Exchange. As of March 2017, the company had 1.54 billion dollars in revenue and 9,557 employees. Honda Motor Company is the largest shareholder, owning 34.6 percent of total shares.

Nissin Kogyo is headquartered in Nagano, Japan with subsidiary manufacturing plants in Ohio, Georgia, USA, Mexico, Brazil, India, Indonesia, Thailand, Vietnam and China.

In 2016, Nissin Kogyo created Veoneer-Nissin Brake Systems(VNBS), a joint subsidiary with Swedish automotive safety manufacturer Veoneer.

On 30 October 2019, Nissin Kogyo along with 2 other companies Keihin Corporation and Showa Corporation announced that they would be merged with Hitachi Automotive Systems.Merger Notice

Further reading

References

External links
 

Motorcycle parts manufacturers
Companies based in Nagano Prefecture
Companies listed on the Tokyo Stock Exchange
Japanese companies established in 1953
Manufacturing companies established in 1953
Auto parts suppliers of Japan
Japanese brands
Honda
Vehicle braking technologies